Céline Couderc (born 11 March 1983 in Avignon, Vaucluse) is a female freestyle swimmer from France, who twice competed for her native country at the Summer Olympics: in 2004 and 2008.

References 

1983 births
Living people
French female freestyle swimmers
Swimmers at the 2004 Summer Olympics
Swimmers at the 2008 Summer Olympics
Olympic swimmers of France
Sportspeople from Avignon
European Aquatics Championships medalists in swimming
Mediterranean Games gold medalists for France
Mediterranean Games silver medalists for France
Swimmers at the 2005 Mediterranean Games
Universiade medalists in swimming
Mediterranean Games medalists in swimming
Universiade gold medalists for France
Medalists at the 2003 Summer Universiade